Tell Ramad is a prehistoric, Neolithic tell at the foot of Mount Hermon, about  southwest of Damascus in Syria.

The tell was discovered by French customs officers, M Company and Lieutenant Potut. Laurisson Ward visited again in 1939 and collected material from the surface, now in the Peabody Museum. Tell Ramad lay somewhat forgotten until it was rediscovered by W.J. van Liere and Henri de Contenson, the latter leading excavations in 8 seasons between 1963 and 1973.

Notable features from the earliest stage include a number of 3–4 metre diameter, lime-plaster floored, clay lined oval pits with ovens & clay bins that were suggested to have been used as houses.

Tell Ramad is notable as one of the few sites fundamental to our understanding of the origin of agriculture with finds including various types of domesticated wheat, barley and flax. Emmer wheat is an important characteristic of Basin sites in this area, where it is thought to have been introduced. Wild plant foods include pistachios, almonds, figs and wild pears.

Footnotes

Further reading
 de Contenson, H. Cauvin, M.-C. Courtois, L. Ducos, P. Dupeyron, M. van Zeist, W. - Ramad. Site Néolitique en Damascène (Syrie) aux VIIIe et VIIe Millénaires Avant l´Ère Chrétienne, Bibliothèque Archéologique et Histoire, Tome 157, Beirut,  2000.
 van Zeist, W. Bakker-Heeres, J.A.H. - Archaeobotanical Studies in the Levant 1. Neolithic Sites in the Damascus Basin: Aswad, Ghoraifé, Ramad - Palaeohistoria, 24, 165-256, 1982.
 Vogel, J.C. Waterbolk, H.T. - Groningen Radiocarbon Dates VII - Radiocarbon, 9, 107-155, 1967.
 Ferembach, D. - Étude anthropologique des ossements humains néolithiques Tell Ramad (Syrie). Annales archéologiques de Syrie, 19, 49-70, 1969.
 de Contenson, H. Troisiéme campagne á Tell ramad 1966: rapport préliminaire. Annales Archéologiques de Syria XVII (1–2), 17–24, 1967.
 de Contenson, H. Découvertes récentes dans la domaine du Néolithique en Syrie, L'Anthropologie, 70, 388-391, 1966.
 de Contenson, H. van Liere, W.J. Premiers pas vers une chronologie absolue à Tell Ramad, Annales Archéologiques Arabes Syriennes, 16, 175-176, 1966.
 de Contenson, H. van Liere, W.J. Sondages à Tell Ramad en 1963: rapport préliminaire, Annales Archéologiques Arabes Syriennes, 14, 190, 1964.
 de Contenson, H. van Liere, W.J. A Note on Five Early Neolithic Sites in Inland Syria 13, 175-209, 1963.

1939 archaeological discoveries
Neolithic settlements
Neolithic sites in Syria
Archaeological sites in Rif Dimashq Governorate
Populated places established in the 8th millennium BC